Original soundtrack album of music from the film Battle of the Brave (Nouvelle-France), composed by Patrick Doyle.

Tracks 

Ouverture (7.04)
Bonjour Marie (2.35)
Les Hommes De Bigot (1.59)
Le Bal / Gavotte & Menuet (2.30)
Des Etoiles Dans Ma Tête (2.11)
L'intervention d'Angelique (1.12)
La Lettre (3.29)
La Bataille De Québec (2.38)
Nouvelle / France N'est Plus (1.58)
Maillard & Marie-Loup (4.22)
Les Retrouvailles (4.26)
Bagarre Dans La Forêt (1.51)
La Berceuse De Marie-Loup (1.35)
Le Départ De France (4.18)
Le Destin De Marie-Loup (7.40)
La Fin De L'histoire (1.49)
Ma Nouvelle-France (3.10)

Credits 
 Music Composed by: Patrick Doyle
 Conducted by; James Shearman
 Orchestrated by: Patrick Doyle, James Shearman & Lawrence Ashmore
 Music Produced by: Maggie Rodford for Air-Edel
 Album Produced by: Patrick Doyle & Maggie Rodford
 Music Editor: James Bellamy
 Music Recorded at ICN 2 Studios, Prague
 Music Mixed at Air-Edel Studios, London
 Engineer: Nick Wollage
 Assistant Engineers: Nick Taylor, Cenda Kotzmann, Petr Kovanda, Jan Kotzman
 Programmer & Assistant to Patrick Doyle: Simon Greenaway
 Musicians Contractor: Zdena Pelikanova, Stephen Coleman
 Orchestra Leader: Vladimir Frank
 Music Published by: Patrick Doyle Music/Air-Edel Associates London

Patrick Doyle would like to thank: Lesley, Abigail, Nuala, Patrick and Elliot Doyle.  All at Air-Edel.  Jean Beaudin, Robert and Ashley Sidaway, Richard Goodreau, Celine Dion, Rene Angelil, Vito Luprano, Chris Neil, Vlado Meller and all the musicians of the Orchestra.

Ma Nouvelle France 
 Performed by: Celine Dion
 Music by: Patrick Doyle
 Lyrics by: Luc Plamondon
 Produced by: Chris Neil
 Instruments programmed & played by: Martin Sutton
 Guitars: Robbie McCintosh
 Celine Dion recorded at Digital Insights Studios, Las Vegas
 Music recorded at Studio Vale House, Bucks
 Mixed by: Humberto Gatica
 Assisted by: Francois Lalonde
 Mixed at Studio Westlake, Los Angeles

Patrick Doyle soundtracks
Romance film soundtracks
2004 soundtrack albums